Screenonline is a website about the history of British film, television and social history as documented by film and television. The project has been developed by the British Film Institute and funded by a £1.2 million grant from the National Lottery New Opportunities Fund.

Reviews featured on the site are usually of significant film or television topics, including production companies, films and television programmes. The site also offers downloads of clips or full episodes of television programmes, although these are only viewable in registered libraries and educational institutions.

References

External links
 website

Film organisations in the United Kingdom
Film archives in the United Kingdom
British Film Institute
History websites of the United Kingdom